Leone Manti (13 February 1944 – 15 February 2023) was an Italian politician. A member of the Christian Democracy party, he served in the Chamber of Deputies from 1992 to 1994.

Manti died on 15 February 2023, at the age of 79.

References

1944 births
2023 deaths
Christian Democracy (Italy) politicians
Members of the Regional Council of Calabria
Deputies of Legislature XI of Italy
People from the Province of Reggio Calabria